Seonamhaeicola aphaedonensis is a Gram-negative, rod-shaped and non-motile bacterium from the genus of Seonamhaeicola which has been isolated from tidal flat sediments from the Aphae Island.

References

Flavobacteria
Bacteria described in 2014